Hüseyin Cahit Hamamcı (born 1 January 1951) is a Turkish football manager.

References

1951 births
Living people
Turkish football managers
Diyarbakırspor managers
Karşıyaka S.K. managers
Çanakkale Dardanelspor managers
Göztepe S.K. managers
Balıkesirspor managers
Erzurumspor managers
İzmirspor managers
Zeytinburnuspor managers
Elazığspor managers
Konyaspor managers
Sakaryaspor managers
Kayserispor managers